14-Cinnamoyloxycodeinone is the most potent example in a series of opiate analgesic drugs discovered in the 1960s, with > ×100 times the potency of morphine. In another paper, Buckett assigns the potency as 177 with a range (depending on animal and test) of  ×101 - ×310. It may be of interest to researchers that the allyl group in this compound and in allylprodine overlay very closely.

See also 
 14-Phenylpropoxymetopon
 7-PET
 N-Phenethylnormorphine
 N-Phenethyl-14-ethoxymetopon
 Phenomorphan
 RAM-378
 Ro4-1539

References 

4,5-Epoxymorphinans
Semisynthetic opioids
Mu-opioid receptor agonists